Jungle Flight is a 1947 American adventure film directed by Sam Newfield and written by Whitman Chambers. The film stars Robert Lowery, Ann Savage, Barton MacLane, Douglas Fowley, Robert Kent and Curt Bois. The film was released on August 22, 1947, by Paramount Pictures.

Plot

The movie revolves around Kelly Jordan (Robert Lowery) and Andy Melton (Robert Kent) who are former AAF fliers , who operate a cargo service near South American mountain ranges to fulfill their basic needs and to achieve their dream of Commercial Line in Texas. Andy got killed in a plane crash and then Kelly meet Laurey Roberts (Ann Savage), who helped him to get a new job at mining-camp as a cook. Laurey is also running away from her husband Tom Hammond (Douglas Fowley), who later catch up with Laurey but eventually killed in a gun fight and Kelly and Laurey leave for Texas.

Cast 
Robert Lowery as Kelly Jordan
Ann Savage as Laurey Roberts
Barton MacLane as Case Hagin
Douglas Fowley as Tom Hammond
Robert Kent as Andy Melton
Curt Bois as Pepe
Duncan Renaldo as Police Capt. Costa

References

External links 
 

1947 films
1940s English-language films
Paramount Pictures films
American adventure films
1947 adventure films
Films directed by Sam Newfield
American black-and-white films
1940s American films